Tee Siew Kiong is a Malaysian politician. He was the Member of Johor State Legislative Assembly for Pulai Sebatang from 2004 to 2018 and had served as Johor State Executive Councillor from 2013 to 2018.

Politics 
On 14 May 2013, he took the oath to become the first EXCO of MCA after the 2013 Malaysian general election after members of MCA had decided that they will not hold any post if their 2013 election result is worse than the 2008 election. 

In the 2022 Johor state election, he criticised the MCA president, Wee Ka Siong for letting UMNO to contest for the Pulai Sebatang seat, which is a traditional MCA seat. On 17 May 2022, his MCA membership was suspended for 5 years due to his criticism, which is the harshest punishment in MCA. On 26 May 2022, he had given up his rights to appeal and quitted the party.

Election Results

Honours 

  :
  Companion Class I of the Order of Malacca (DMSM) - Datuk

References 

Living people
People from Johor
Malaysian people of Hokkien descent
Malaysian people of Chinese descent
Former Malaysian Chinese Association politicians
21st-century Malaysian politicians
Year of birth missing (living people)
Members of the Johor State Legislative Assembly
Johor state executive councillors